Pietro Vichi "Pete" Domenici (May 7, 1932 – September 13, 2017) was an American attorney and politician who served as a United States Senator from New Mexico from 1973 to 2009. A member of the Republican Party, he served six terms in the Senate, making him the longest-tenured U.S. Senator in the state's history. To date, Domenici is the last Republican to be elected to the Senate from New Mexico. He was succeeded by Democratic U.S. Representative Tom Udall.

During Domenici's tenure in the Senate, he advocated waterway usage fees, nuclear power and related causes. He received criticism for his environmental record and extramarital affair. Domenici chaired several key committees including the Senate Budget Committee and Senate Energy Committee.

Early years
Domenici was born in Albuquerque, New Mexico, to Alda (née Vichi) and Cherubino Domenici, both of whom were born in Modena, Italy.

Growing up, Domenici worked in his father's grocery business after school. In 1950, he graduated from St. Mary's High School in Albuquerque. He spent two years at the College of St. Joseph on the Rio Grande before earning a degree in education at the University of New Mexico, Albuquerque in 1954, where he was a member of Sigma Alpha Epsilon fraternity.

After graduating, Domenici pitched one season for the Albuquerque Dukes, then a Class C Minor league baseball team. He also taught mathematics at Garfield Junior High in Albuquerque. Domenici earned his law degree at the University of Denver law school in 1958 and returned to practice law in Albuquerque.

Political career
In 1966, Domenici successfully ran for a position on the Albuquerque City Commission and in 1968 was elected Commission Chairman (a post equivalent to that of mayor).

Domenici was the Republican nominee for governor in the 1970 New Mexico gubernatorial race, which he lost to Democrat and former state House Speaker Bruce King. King won the election with 148,835 votes (51 percent) to Domenici's 134,640 (46 percent).

Senate career
In 1972, Domenici successfully ran for a position in the U.S. Senate and became the first New Mexico Republican to be elected to the position in 38 years. He was aided by Richard Nixon's landslide win over Democratic U.S. Senator George McGovern at the top of the ticket. Domenici polled 204,253 votes (54 percent) to 173,815 (46 percent) for Democratic nominee Jack Daniels, a Hobbs realtor.

Domenici was subsequently re-elected in 1978, 1984, 1990, 1996, and 2002 and is to date the longest-serving senator in his state's history, having served in the legislative body for 36 years. At the time of his retirement, he was the ranking member of the United States Senate Committee on Energy and Natural Resources and the United States Senate Appropriations Subcommittee on Energy and Water Development. He was also a member of the U.S. Senate Committees on Appropriations and Indian Affairs, and served as Chairman and Ranking Minority Member of the Budget Committee. He advocated for the mentally ill, having pushed the Mental Health Parity Act of 1996.

Domenici voted in favor of the bill establishing Martin Luther King Jr. Day as a federal holiday and the Civil Rights Restoration Act of 1987 (as well as to override President Reagan's veto). Domenici voted in favor of the nominations of Robert Bork and Clarence Thomas to the U.S. Supreme Court.

In 1998, Domenici voted to convict President Bill Clinton during his impeachment trial. He explained his vote: 

This was despite Domenici’s own adulterous affair at age 50 with 24-year-old Michelle Laxalt, daughter of his Senate colleague, Paul Laxalt. The affair, resulting in the birth of a son, would remain secret for decades.

Water fees
One of the first issues that Domenici concerned himself with was waterway usage fees, in spite of his state lacking any waterway capable of commercial traffic - although it did have a prominent railway industry. The idea behind a waterway usage fee was that the Army Corps of Engineers built dams and other expensive waterway projects, which the barge industry was able to use for free. In 1977, Domenici set himself to the task of enacting a waterway usage fee. After a long two-year battle with stiff lobbying on both sides, the waterway fee was finally passed along with a new lock and dam project (the rebuilding of Lock and Dam 26 at Alton, Illinois). Reporters attributed the passage of this fee in no small part to Domenici's legislative skill. The legislation was signed into law in 1978.

The issue greatly assisted Domenici in his home state, where the railroad industry was a significant player (railroads competed with barges, and they had long wanted to end the "free ride" issue). The railroads donated $40,000 to Domenici's campaign, and the barge industry gave a small sum to his opponent. He was reelected in 1978 with 53.4% of the vote over Democratic nominee Toney Anaya, a former New Mexico Attorney General. The 6.8% victory margin would be Domenici's closest election in his Senate career.

Environmental record

The organization Republicans for Environmental Protection singled out Domenici as "Worst in the Senate in 2006" on environmental issues. In addition to assigning Domenici a score of zero for his environmental voting record, the group issued him "environmental harm demerits" for what they saw as two particularly irresponsible acts: first, for spearheading efforts to include in federal budget legislation provisions for "speculative revenues from oil drilling in the Arctic National Wildlife Refuge; second, "for sponsoring and securing passage of S. 3711, the Gulf of Mexico Energy Security Act, which would perpetuate America's dangerous oil dependence, set a precedent for drilling in sensitive marine waters, and direct a disproportionate share of federal royalty revenues from a public resource to four states."
	 
Domenici also received an exceptionally low environmental rating from the League of Conservation Voters, who claimed in 2003 that "[d]uring the last decade his voting record has become even more strikingly anti-environmental." The LCV went on to criticize Domenici for voting in 1995 "to allow mining companies to 'patent' (purchase) public lands in order to extract minerals from them, without environmental standards, for the ridiculously low 'price' of $5 an acre or less."

Nuclear power

Domenici was an avid proponent of nuclear power and published two books on the subject: A Brighter Tomorrow: Fulfilling the Promise of Nuclear Energy (Lanham, Maryland: Rowman & Littlefield Publishers, 2004), which he wrote; and Advanced Nuclear Technologies — Hearing Before the Committee on Appropriations, U.S. Senate (Collingdale, Pennsylvania: Diane Publishing Company, 1999), which he edited.

Committee Assignments
 Committee on Appropriations
 Subcommittee on Commerce, Justice, Science, and Related Agencies
 Subcommittee on Defense
 Subcommittee on Energy and Water Development (Ranking Member)
 Subcommittee on Homeland Security
 Subcommittee on Interior, Environment, and Related Agencies
 Subcommittee on Transportation, Housing and Urban Development, and Related Agencies
 Committee on Energy and Natural Resources (Ranking Member)
 Subcommittee on Energy (Ex Officio)
 Subcommittee on National Parks (Ex Officio)
 Subcommittee on Public Lands and Forests (Ex Officio)
 Subcommittee on Water and Power (Ex Officio)
 Committee on Homeland Security and Governmental Affairs
 Ad Hoc Subcommittee on Disaster Recovery
 Ad Hoc Subcommittee on State, Local, and Private Sector Preparedness and Integration
 Permanent Subcommittee on Investigations
 Subcommittee on Federal Financial Management, Government Information, Federal Services, and International Security
 Committee on the Budget
 Committee on Indian Affairs

Department of Justice controversy

Prior to the 2006 midterm election Domenici called and allegedly pressured then-United States Attorney for the District of New Mexico David Iglesias to speed up indictments in a federal corruption investigation that involved at least one former Democratic state senator. When Iglesias said an indictment would not be handed down until at least December, Domenici said "I'm very sorry to hear that" — and the line went dead. Domenici's telephone manners were the subject of a later article in The Albuquerque Journal, which quoted numerous other sources whom Domenici had treated rudely by hanging up after making a point or receiving an unsatisfactory answer. Iglesias was fired a little over one month later by the Bush Administration. In a March 2007 statement, Domenici admitted making such a call. House Judiciary Committee Chairman John Conyers, D-Mich., issued subpoenas to require Iglesias and three other ousted U.S. attorneys to testify before Congress.

Domenici later admitted calling Iglesias, though Domenici claimed he never used the word "November" when he called Iglesias about an ongoing Albuquerque courthouse corruption case. Domenici denied trying to influence Iglesias, and hired lawyer K. Lee Blalack II to represent him.

According to the Justice Department, Domenici called the Department and demanded Iglesias be replaced on four occasions.

According to The Washington Post, on the day of the firing (December 7, 2006) William Kelley, a deputy to then White House Counsel Harriet Miers, said in an email that Domenici's chief of staff was "happy as a clam" about the Iglesias firing. A week later, a Justice Department email to the White House counsel stated: "Domenici is going to send over names tomorrow (not even waiting for Iglesias's body to cool)."

On April 24, 2008, Domenici was admonished by the Senate Ethics Committee for "inappropriately" contacting in 2006 one of the nine U.S. attorneys later fired by President Bush.

The committee found "no substantial evidence" that Domenici tried to influence attorney David Iglesias when he contacted him to inquire about the status of a 2006 investigation into corruption charges on a state Democratic official. A possible indictment could have buoyed the re-election hopes of Rep. Heather Wilson (R-N.M.), who was seeking to replace Domenici when the senator retired. Iglesias charged that Domenici and Wilson were pressuring him to wrap up the investigation before that November's elections, a violation of ethics rules. The Ethics Committee said that Domenici's phone call to Iglesias, in advance of an upcoming election, "created an appearance of impropriety that reflected unfavorably on the Senate".

In July 2010, Department of Justice prosecutors closed the two-year investigation without filing charges after determining that the firing was not criminal, saying "Evidence did not demonstrate that any prosecutable criminal offense was committed with regard to the removal of David Iglesias.  The investigative team also determined that the evidence did not warrant expanding the scope of the investigation beyond the removal of Iglesias."  Domenici said of the closed investigation, "The Justice Department has now confirmed what I have always said and believed: I never attempted to interfere with any government investigation.  I am glad that this matter has concluded."

Electoral history
2002 New Mexico United States Senatorial Election
 Pete Domenici (R) (inc.), 65%
 Gloria Tristani (D), 35%

1996 New Mexico United States Senatorial Election
 Pete Domenici (R) (inc.), 64%
 Art Trujillo (D), 30%

1990 New Mexico United States Senatorial Election
 Pete Domenici (R) (inc.), 72.9%
 Tom R. Benavides (D), 27.1%

1984 New Mexico United States Senatorial Election
 Pete Domenici (R) (inc.), 71.9%
 Judith A. Pratt (D), 28.1%

1978 New Mexico United States Senatorial Election
 Pete Domenici (R) (inc.), 53.4%
 Toney Anaya (D), 46.6%

1972 New Mexico United States Senatorial Election
 Pete Domenici (R), 54%
 Jack Daniels (D), 46%

Life after politics
On October 4, 2007, Domenici announced his decision not to seek re-election to the Senate in 2008 for health reasons (specifically, frontotemporal lobar degeneration). His seat was won by Democrat Tom Udall.

After leaving the Senate, Domenici served as a senior fellow for the Bipartisan Policy Center. Domenici and former OMB director and CBO director Dr. Alice Rivlin chaired a Debt Reduction Task Force sponsored by the Bipartisan Policy Center. The task force was announced at a joint press conference on January 26, 2010, in Washington. The task force began its work in February 2010 and, led by Domenici, released a report on November 17, 2010 on ways to address and reduce the national debt and deficit.

The Domenici Institute, which aims to continue "Domenici's legacy of service to the state of New Mexico", bears his name.

Personal life
After graduating from law school in 1958, Domenici married Nancy Burk. Together, the Domenicis had two sons and six daughters (Lisa, Peter, Nella, Clare, David, Nanette, and twins Paula and Helen). One of his daughters has schizophrenia; this reportedly influenced his decision to become a strong supporter of legislation providing for parity in insurance coverage for mental illness. Helen ran unsuccessfully for the Maryland House of Delegates in 2018 as a Republican nominee in District 19, but did not win the general election.

During the 1970s, Domenici fathered a child, Adam Laxalt, with Michelle Laxalt, a Republican staffer and lobbyist and the daughter of Domenici's then-Senate colleague, Nevada Republican Paul Laxalt; this fact was kept secret until 2013. In 2013, Domenici, then 80, acknowledged the affair and his son, saying he was "very sorry" for his behavior. Adam Laxalt ran for Attorney General of Nevada in the 2014 election and defeated Democrat Ross Miller. Laxalt was the Republican nominee for Governor of Nevada in the 2018 election, losing to Steve Sisolak, and the Republican nominee for Senator in the 2022 midterms, losing to Catherine Cortez Masto.

Death
Domenici died on September 13, 2017, at the age of 85, at the University of New Mexico Hospital in Albuquerque, New Mexico, from complications that resulted from abdominal surgery. His funeral was held on the morning of September 16 in Albuquerque.

Bibliography
 "A Brighter Tomorrow: Fulfilling the Promise of Nuclear Energy" (Lanham, Maryland: Rowman & Littlefield Publishers, 2004. )
 "Advanced Nuclear Technologies — Hearing Before the Committee on Appropriations, U.S. Senate" (Collingdale, Pennsylvania: D I A N E Publishing Company, 1999. ), which he edited.

See also
 Energy Policy Act of 2005, sponsored by Senator Domenici and Representative Joe Barton.
 New Mexico State University's Domenici Institute.
 List of federal political sex scandals in the United States

References

Further reading
 Fenno, Richard. The emergence of a Senate leader: Pete Domenici and the Reagan budget (1991)  online free to borrow

External links

 
 Pete V. Domenici news. – The New York Times. – collected news and commentary
 

|-

|-

|-

|-

|-

|-

1932 births
2017 deaths
21st-century American politicians
New Mexico city council members
New Mexico Republicans
Mayors of Albuquerque, New Mexico
Republican Party United States senators from New Mexico
Sturm College of Law alumni
University of New Mexico alumni
Educators from New Mexico
New Mexico lawyers
Albuquerque Dukes players
Baseball players from New Mexico
University of Albuquerque alumni
Bipartisan Policy Center
20th-century American lawyers
American people of Italian descent